Tascosa High School is a public high school located in Amarillo, Texas (USA) and classified as a 5A school by the UIL.  It is one of four high schools in the Amarillo Independent School District located in southern Potter County.  The school was opened in 1958.  In 2015, the school was rated "Met Standard" by the Texas Education Agency.  The school's motto is Non Sibi Sed Omnibus, a Latin phrase meaning "Not for oneself, but for all."

Athletics
The Tascosa Rebels compete in the following sports - 

Cross Country, Cheerleading, Drill team, Volleyball, Football, Wrestling, Basketball, Swimming, Soccer, Golf, Tennis, Track, Softball& Baseball

State titles
Girls Basketball - 
1991(5A)
Team Tennis - 
1996(5A)
Boys Track - 
1963(4A)
Girls Wrestling - 
2002(All), 2014(5A)
One Act Play - 
1969(4A), 1971(4A) boys wrestling (5A) 2023

Notable alumni
 Melinda Bordelon - illustrator
 Gail Caldwell - author
 Tucker Davidson - Major League Baseball pitcher
 Kevin Fowler, Class of 1984 - country musician
 Paul Lockhart, Class of 1974 - former USAF test pilot and astronaut
 Alex O'Brien - professional tennis player
 Walter Thomas Price, IV, Class of 1986 - Amarillo attorney
 Brent Scott, Class of 1973 - U.S. Navy chief of chaplains
 Brandon Slay - U.S. gold medalist in wrestling
 J.D. Souther - singer/songwriter associated with The Eagles
 Terry Stafford, singer song-writer, sang the #1 hit Suspicion in 1964
 Francie Swift - actress
 Jim Wilson - recording artist and piano technician
 Lauren Hough -  New York Times Best Selling author and essayist.

References

External links
Tascosa High School

Educational institutions established in 1958
Amarillo Independent School District
Schools in Potter County, Texas
Public high schools in Texas
1958 establishments in Texas